was a Japanese animator best known for directing the anime series Space Battleship Yamato II, Super Dimension Fortress Macross, Super Dimension Century Orguss, Humanoid Monster Bem, Megazone 23 - Part I, Legend of the Galactic Heroes, and Tytania.

He was in a Hawaiian folk music band in his youth. Therefore, he was known as an animation director who could actually read musical scores and had made the best use of his previous experience for works such as The Super Dimension Fortress Macross: Do You Remember Love? and Legend of the Galactic Heroes.

Death 
Ishiguro died on 20 March 2012 in Kawasaki City Hospital of a lung infection which was the result of a follow-up surgery procedure to the aneurysm surgery he underwent two years prior.

Works

As director

References

External links 
 "Bonus – Interview with Noboru Ishiguro" with Anime World Order
 
 

1938 births
2012 deaths
Anime directors
Japanese animators
Japanese screenwriters
Japanese animated film directors
Japanese animated film producers